Martina Hyde (25 December 1866 – 17 May 1937) was a British archer.  She competed at the 1908 Summer Olympics in London. Hyde competed at the 1908 Games in the only archery event open to women, the double National round.  She took 20th place in the event with 419 points.

References

External links
 
 
 Martina Hyde's profile at Sports Reference.com

1866 births
1937 deaths
Archers at the 1908 Summer Olympics
Olympic archers of Great Britain
British female archers
20th-century British women